George Maestri is the President and Creative Director of the Los Angeles animation studio Rubber Bug, a writer, an animation producer for South Park, and a story writer for the animated television series Rocko's Modern Life.

Maestri was nominated for a CableACE Award for his Rocko's Modern Life writing.

Maestri has written a number of books on character animation and digital effects.  He is also a contributing editor of Computer Graphics World magazine.

He is also an active member in lynda.com teaching several animation related techniques

Books
 Digital Character Animation 2, Volume I: Essential Techniques
 Digital Character Animation 3

References

External links
 Lisa (Kiczuk) Trainor interviews George Maestri, story writer for Rocko's Modern Life
 http://www.lynda.com/George-Maestri/31-1.html
 

Year of birth missing (living people)
Living people
American male writers
American animators
American animated film producers